The Worser Bay Boating Club is a yacht club based in Worser Bay, New Zealand. It was founded in 1926 and has become a leader in the New Zealand-specific Sunburst and Zephyr class dinghy yachts. There is also a strong emphasis on youth sailing in Optimist, P-Class, Starling and 29er dinghies. Of late, Lasers and 12-ft Skiffs have become increasingly popular.

Wellington sports club of the year, 2016.

National champions

2015 – Sam Bacon: Optimist

International champions
2002 – Greg Wilcox: world OK dinghy champion; member of OK Dinghy International Association Hall of Fame.
2008 – Karl Purdie: world OK dinghy champion.
2010 – Karl Purdie: world OK dinghy champion.

References

1926 establishments in New Zealand
Sailing in New Zealand
Yacht clubs in New Zealand
Sports organizations established in 1926